Read All About It may refer to:

Books
 Read All About It!: Great Read-Aloud Stories, Poems, and Newspaper Pieces for Preteens and Teens, a 1993 book by Jim Trelease

Film and TV
 Read All About It!, a 1979-1983 Canadian educational television series
 Read All About It, a 1945 film featuring Derek Gorst
 Read All About It, a 1974-1979 BBC books programme
 "Read All About It", an episode of the Canadian-American children's television series Caillou.

Music
 Read All About It, a 1988 album by Newsboys
 "Read All About It" (song), a 2011 song by Professor Green featuring Emeli Sandé
 "Read All About It, Pt. II", a 2012 continuation of Green's song featuring Fink
 "Read All About It, Pt. III", a 2012 continuation of Green's song by Emeli Sandé
 "Read All About It", a song by The Flirtations
 "Read All About It", a song by Raven from Wiped Out

See also
 Extra Texture (Read All About It), a 1975 album by George Harrison
 "Extra Extra (Read All About It)", a song Ralph Carter from When You're Young and in Love